MV Tuzla is a Turkish-owned, Vanuatu-flagged general cargo ship that was damaged by a missile strike during the 2022 Russian invasion of Ukraine.

History 
Tuzla was built in 1980 and is owned by the Istanbul-based company Cayeli Shipping. The ship was trapped in the Dnipro river at the port of Kherson at the outset of the Russian invasion of Ukraine in February 2022. For roughly a year, the ship remained there in a laid-up condition with its AIS turned off.

On 24 January 2023, the Russian Army repeatedly shelled Kherson. According to the ship's master, at around 2100 local time, Tuzla was struck in the bridge by a missile or artillery, severely damaging the ship and starting a fire that burned out the bridge. Another Turkish ship, the Ferahnaz, was also damaged, but to a much lesser degree.

References 

Cargo ships of Turkey
1980 ships
Maritime incidents in 2023